Ferrocalamus, or iron bamboo, is a genus of Chinese bamboo in the grass family. endemic to China. The plant is known only from southern Yunnan, at elevations of 900 to 1,200 m above sea level.

Taxonomy
The genus Ferrocalamus is related to Indocalamus. However, Ferrocalamus is tree-like while Indocalamus is a shrub.

Description
Ferrocalamus are perennial shrubby bamboos having  erect culms.  The culms are about 5–9 m long with 20–50 mm diameter. The internodes are long, thick walled, with a ring of white hairs below the nodes. Culm sheaths are persistent, leathery at base, thinner at apex. The auricles are small or absent. Leaf blade is large with transverse venation. Inflorescence is a large panicle on leafy flowering branches. It has 3 stamens with free filaments. Ovary is glabrous having short styles short, with 2 stigmas. Fruit is rounded berry-like, succulent with thickened, fleshy pericarp but without hardened endocarp.

Species
 Ferrocalamus fibrillosus
 Ferrocalamus rimosivaginus
 Ferrocalamus strictus

Uses
In the past, the culms were commonly used for making arrows.

References

External links
 Information at The Plant List
 Profile at UniProt
 Nucleotide database at NCBI

Bambusoideae
Endemic flora of Yunnan
Bambusoideae genera